The 2014–15 Cypriot First Division (women) was the 17th season of women's league football under the Cyprus Football Association.

The league was won by Apollon Limassol, its seventh consecutive title. By winning, Apollon qualified to 2015–16 UEFA Women's Champions League.

League table

External links
Cyprus Women's Soccer Championship 14/15 Cyprus Football Association
First Division Women 2015 Soccrway

Cyprus
2014–15 in Cypriot football